F.L.Y. was a Latvian band created to participate in the Eurovision Song Contest.

At a party following the national finals of the Eurovision Song Contest 2002, Mārtiņš Freimanis came up with an idea for the following year’s contest.
In the autumn of 2002, during a golf tournament hosted by Latvijas Televīzija, Mārtiņš Freimanis, Lauris Reiniks and Yana Kay, started discussing such a co-operative venture and so the trio F.L.Y. was born. Their song "Hello from Mars" was written by Mārtiņš Freimanis and Lauris Reiniks and recorded soon after.

Each member of F.L.Y. had further careers. Yana Kay and Lauris Reiniks each released an album, whilst Mārtiņš Freimanis was the lead singer of the band Tumsa, which has three albums to its credit.

Yana Kay, Lauris Reiniks and Mārtiņš Freimanis have all participated separately in the national finals of the Eurovision Song Contest preliminaries, but their big break – the chance to represent Latvia at the Eurovision international finals – came in year 2003, when they participated as a group.

After spending time together promoting their Eurovision Song Contest entry, F.L.Y. started jamming and creating new songs. As a result an album was made and released in Latvia at the beginning of May 2003. They represented Latvia in the Eurovision Song Contest 2003 and got 24th place.

The band broke up in 2005.

On 27 January 2011, Mārtiņš Freimanis died in a hospital in Riga of complications from an influenza A infection.

References

Musical groups established in 2002
Musical groups disestablished in 2005
Latvian pop music groups
Eurovision Song Contest entrants of 2003
Eurovision Song Contest entrants for Latvia
2002 establishments in Latvia